The Rhodogorgonales are an order of red algae, a sister group to the corallines. They are always thalloid and calcified; their calcification is very different from the corallines, as individual calcite crystals are deposited in the cell wall of specialised cells; this suggests that the evolution of calcification may have been independent from the corallines. They have no fossil record.

Unlike the corallinales and sporolithales, their closest relatives, these thalli are loose aggregations of hair-like cells, with the middle portion formed of rhizoid-like filaments.  Spores are borne on the end of hair-like cells (cortical fascicles).

Images can be seen in

Families
As accepted by AlgaeBase;
 Family Elianellaceae  (13 species)
 Anchisolenopora  -	1 sp.
 Elianella  - 1 sp.
 Marinella  - 2 spp.
 Parachaetetes  - 8 spp.
 Solenoporella  - 1 sp.

 Family Rhodogorgonaceae  (5 species)
 Renouxia  -	2 spp.
 Rhodenigma  - 1 sp.
 Rhodogorgon  -	2 spp.

References

Red algae orders
Florideophyceae
Taxa described in 1995